WWE, an American professional wrestling promotion based in Stamford, Connecticut in the United States owned by the McMahon family, has been promoting events in Australia since 1985 when they were the World Wrestling Federation.

History

WWF first toured the country in 1985, visiting Melbourne, Perth, Newcastle and through Brisbane and Melbourne again in 1986. The next time WWE came to Australia was for the WWE Global Warning Tour in 2002 for what was the first WWE event in Australia in 16 years. WWE has visited Australia regularly since then by touring at least once a year from 2003 to 2019, with the 2020 and 2021 tours postponed due to the COVID-19 pandemic.. WWE's NXT brand made its first tour in 2016. In 2018, WWE announced Super Show-Down at the Melbourne Cricket Ground – the first ever WWE pay-per-view (PPV) to be held in Australia.

WWE Global Warning Tour: Melbourne

WWE Global Warning Tour: Melbourne was a professional wrestling event produced by World Wrestling Entertainment that took place on August 10, 2002, at Colonial Stadium in Melbourne, Australia. This event marked the return of WWE to Australia for the first time since 1986. Michael Cole and Tazz recorded the commentary from WWE headquarters in Stamford, Connecticut. The event featured nine matches (including 3 dark matches), where in the main event The Rock defeated Triple H and Brock Lesnar in a Triple Threat match to retain the WWE Undisputed Championship. Global Warning did not air on pay-per-view (PPV), but was released on home video. The event aired in November 2002 as part of the WWE Fanatic Series and in January 2003 on Sky 1 in New Zealand. In October 2018, Global Warning was added to the on demand list on the WWE Network. It was re-released on DVD in December 2018, as part of a double pack with WWE Super Show-Down.

NXT television taping
The first tour to Australia of the NXT brand in December 2016 included a show at Melbourne's Margaret Court Arena which served as a television taping for NXT's January 4, 2017, edition on the WWE Network. Five matches from the show were shown, with Shinsuke Nakamura retaining the NXT Championship against Samoa Joe as the main event. Of the other matches shown three featured Australian wrestlers. Buddy Murphy teamed with Tye Dillinger to defeat the team of Bobby Roode and Elias, TM-61 were defeated by the NXT Tag Team champions DIY (Tommaso Ciampa and Johnny Gargano), and Billie Kay along with Liv Morgan were defeated by Ember Moon. The other televised match saw The Revival defeat the team of Riddick Moss and Tino Sabbatelli. In matches not televised, Peyton Royce could not defeat NXT Women's champion Asuka, Andrade Almas defeated Wesley Blake and Oney Lorcan defeated Patrick Clark.

WWE Super Show-Down

WWE Super Show-Down was a professional wrestling pay-per-view (PPV) event and WWE Network event, produced by WWE for their Raw, SmackDown, and 205 Live brands. It took place on October 6, 2018, at the Melbourne Cricket Ground in Melbourne, Australia and featured ten matches including two involving Australian wrestlers, Buddy Murphy and The IIconics. Murphy defeated Cedric Alexander to win the WWE Cruiserweight Championship, while Billie Kay and Peyton Royce defeated the team of Asuka and Naomi. Elias in a microphone spot also referenced Australian sport, claiming he was friends with Mick Malthouse and accused Collingwood of choking in the previous weekend's match. The event drew 70,309 people.

Tours

References

Professional wrestling in Australia
Australia